The Valley Symphony Orchestra in Los Angeles, California is a community college symphonic orchestra that is associated with Los Angeles Valley College (LAVC).  The current music director of the orchestra is Michael H. Arshagouni, who assumed the helm of the orchestra for the 2009/10 season.  Dr. Arshagouni is also the current chair of the LAVC Department of Music.

The orchestra was founded in 1992 by Robert Chauls, a professor at LAVC to be a community orchestra of professionals and students.  The regular performance venue is the Main stage Theatre at LAVC.

Los Angeles Philharmonic cellist Stephen Custer and violinist
Lawrence Sonderling have been regular guest performers.

Lynn Angebranndt of the Kadima String Quartet is the principal cellist.  The past concertmaster was Rochelle Abramson, a first violinist with the Los Angeles Philharmonic.

On October 13, 2007, guest pianist Neil Galanter played the symphony's first concert of the 2007–2008 season.

Repertoire
The VSO's 2009/10 season included the following repertoire:

 Beethoven - Symphony No.5 in c minor, Op.67 (1st movement)
 Britten - Simple Symphony
 Copland - Appalachian Spring: Ballet for Martha (original version for 13 instruments)
 Elgar - Introduction and Allegro for Strings, Op.47 (Kadima String Quartet - soloists)
 Fiala - Concertante in B-flat for Clarinet and English Horn (Julia Heinen clarinet; Richard Kravchak, English horn)
 Handel - Concerto a due cori No.2 in F, HWV 333
 Haydn - Symphony No.94 "Surprise" (2nd movement)
 Haydn - The Creation: Part 1
 Holst - St. Paul's Suite, Op.29 No.2
 Jenkins - Palladio: Concerto Grosso for String Orchestra
 Mendelssohn - Piano Concerto No.1 in g minor, Op.25 (W. Terrence Spiller, piano)
 Mozart - Don Giovanni: "Overture"
 Mozart - Piano Concerto No.24 in c minor, K.491 (3rd movement; Liya Melikyan, piano)
 Mozart - Symphony No.35 in D, K.385 "Haffner"
 Mysliviczek - Artaserse - selections (US Premiere)
 Rossini - La Gazza Ladra: "Overture"
 Smetana - Ma Vlast: Vltava (The Moldau)
 Vaughan Williams - Fantasia on Greensleves
 Warlock - Capriol: Suite for String Orchestra

References

External links
 Valley Symphony Orchestra (official site)
 Los Angeles Valley College

Musical groups from Los Angeles
Musical groups established in 1992
Orchestras based in California